Harriet Quimby (May 11, 1875 – July 1, 1912) was an American pioneering aviator, journalist, and film screenwriter.

In 1911, she became the first woman in the United States to receive a pilot certificate, issued to her by the Aero Club of America.  In 1912, she became the first woman to fly across the English Channel. Although Quimby lived only to the age of 37, she influenced the role of women in aviation.

Early life and early career

She was born on May 11, 1875, in Arcadia Township, Manistee County, Michigan. Her father had purchased a farm there in 1874, and the family was listed there in the 1880 United States Census. They moved to Arroyo Grande, California, about 1888. After her family moved to San Francisco, California, in the early 1900s, she became a journalist.

Harriet Quimby's public life began in 1902, when she began writing for the San Francisco Dramatic Review and also contributed to the Sunday editions of the San Francisco Chronicle and San Francisco Call. She moved to Manhattan, New York City in 1903 to work as a theater critic for Leslie's Illustrated Weekly and more than 250 of her articles were published over a nine-year period.

Quimby continued to write for Leslie's even when touring with airshows, recounting her adventures in a series of articles. Totally committed to her new passion, the dedicated journalist and aviator avidly promoted the economic potential of commercial aviation and touted flying as an ideal sport for women.

Quimby became interested in aviation in 1910, when she attended the Belmont Park International Aviation Tournament in Elmont, New York. There she met John Moisant, a well-known aviator and operator of a flight school, and his sister Matilde.

On August 1, 1911, she took her pilot's test and became the first U.S. woman to earn an Aero Club of America aviator's certificate. Matilde Moisant soon followed and became the second.

The absence of an official birth certificate enabled many communities to claim her, but the  evidence favors Arcadia Township, Michigan.

Aviation  
After earning her pilot certificate, the "Dresden China Aviatrix" or "China Doll", as the press called her because of her petite stature and fair skin, moved to capitalize on her new notoriety. Pilots could earn as much as $1,000 per performance, and prize money for a race could go as high as $10,000 or more. Quimby joined the Moisant International Aviators, an exhibition team, and made her professional debut, earning $1,500, in a night flight over Staten Island before a crowd of almost 20,000 spectators.

As one of the country's few female pilots, she capitalized on her femininity by wearing trousers tucked into high laced boots accentuated by a plum-colored satin blouse, necklace, and antique bracelet. She drew crowds whenever she competed in cross-country meets and races. As part of the exhibition team, she showcased her talents around the United States and even went to Mexico City at the end of 1911 to participate in aviation activities held in honor of the inauguration of President Francisco I. Madero.

Hollywood
In 1911 Quimby authored seven screenplays or scenarios that were made into silent film shorts by Biograph Studios. All seven were directed by D. W. Griffith. Stars in her films included Florence La Badie, Wilfred Lucas, and Blanche Sweet. Quimby had a small acting role in one movie.

Vin Fiz 

The Vin Fiz Company, a division of Armour Meat Packing Plant of Chicago, recruited Quimby as the spokesperson for the new grape soda, Vin Fiz, after the death of Calbraith Perry Rodgers in April 1912. Her distinctive purple aviator uniform and image graced many of the advertising pieces of the day.

English Channel flight

She became the first woman to pilot an aircraft across the English Channel. Her accomplishment received little media attention, however, as the sinking of the Titanic ocean liner the day before rivetted the interest of the public and filled newspapers.

Death

On July 1, 1912, she flew in the Third Annual Boston Aviation Meet at Squantum, Massachusetts. Although she had obtained her ACA certificate to participate in ACA events, the Boston meet was an unsanctioned contest.

William A. P. Willard, the organizer of the event and father of the aviator Charles F. Willard, was a passenger in her brand-new two-seat Bleriot monoplane. At an altitude of  the aircraft unexpectedly pitched forward for reasons still unknown. Both Willard and Quimby were ejected from their seats and fell to their deaths, while the plane "glided down and lodged itself in the mud".

Harriet Quimby was buried in the Woodlawn Cemetery in The Bronx, New York. The following year her remains were moved to the Kensico Cemetery in Valhalla, New York. A cenotaph to Quimby, the Harriet Quimby Compass Rose Fountain, stands at Pierce Brothers/Valhalla Memorial Park Cemetery in Burbank, California. Located close to the cemetery's Portal of the Folded Wings, a shrine containing the ashes of aviation pioneers, the Quimby fountain's plaque reads:
Harriet Quimby became the first licensed female pilot in America on August 1, 1911. On April 16, 1912, she was the first woman to fly a plane across the English Channel. She pointed the direction for future women pilots including her friend, Matilde Moisant, buried at the Portal of the Folded Wings.

Filmography

As actress

As writer

Legacy

In 1991 the United States Postal Service issued a 50 cent airmail postage stamp featuring Harriet Quimby.

She is memorialized in two official Michigan historical markers. One is located near Coldwater. The other was erected near the now abandoned farmhouse in Arcadia Township where Quimby lived from 1875 to about 1888.

In 2004 Quimby was inducted into the National Aviation Hall of Fame.

In 2012 Quimby was inducted into the Long Island Air and Space Hall of Fame.

The Old Rhinebeck Aerodrome possesses a flyable Anzani-powered one-seater Blériot XI, which bears the Blériot factory's serial number 56, showing that it was manufactured in 1909. Since Quimby's plane, in 1912, was a brand new two-seater, the idea that the former was the aircraft that she was flying in 1912 seems to be an urban legend.

Quimby Road at Reid–Hillview Airport in San Jose, California, is named in her honor.

Selected coverage in The New York Times 
The New York Times, May 11, 1911, page 6, "Woman in trousers daring aviator; Long Island folk discover that miss Harriet Quimby is making flights at Garden City"
The New York Times, August 2, 1911, page 7, "Miss Quimby wins air pilot license"
The New York Times, September 5, 1911, page 5, "Girl flies by night at Richmond fair; Harriet Quimby darts about in the moonshine above an admiring crowd"
The New York Times, September 18, 1911, page 7, "Women aviators to race; the Misses Moisant, Quimby, Scott, and Dutrieu at Nassau meet"
The New York Times, September 28, 1911, page 2, "Miss Quimby's flight"
The New York Times, April 17, 1912, page 15, "Quimby flies English Channel"
The New York Times, June 21, 1912, page 14, "Woman to fly with mail; Miss Quimby Plans Air Trip from Boston to New York"
The New York Times, July 2, 1912, page 1, "Miss Quimby dies in airship fall"
The New York Times, July 3, 1912, page 7, "Quimby tragedy unexplained"
The New York Times, July 4, 1912, page 7, "Services for Harriet Quimby to-night"
The New York Times, July 5, 1912, page 13, "Eulogizes Harriet Quimby"
The New York Times, July 7, 1912, magazine, "When aviation becomes not only dangerous but foolhardy"

Further reading 
"An American Girl's Daring Exploit" by Harriet Quimby
"Miss Harriet Quimby – America's First and Most Successful Aviatrix"
Harriet Quimby's October 4, 1906 Article "A Woman's Exciting Ride in a Racing Motor-car"

See also
Raymonde de Laroche, first woman to be issued a pilot's license
List of firsts in aviation

References

External links 

Centennial of Flight: Harriet Quimby
PBS: Harriet Quimby
PBS NOVA: "Queen of the Channel Crossing" by Peter Tyson
Eyewitness History: Harriet Quimby
FIU: Harriet Quimby 

1875 births
1912 deaths
Screenwriters from New York (state)
Aviators from Michigan
Aviators killed in aviation accidents or incidents in the United States
Deaths by falling out of an aircraft
People from Coldwater, Michigan
People from Manistee County, Michigan
Writers from New York City
Writers from San Francisco
American women screenwriters
Accidental deaths in Massachusetts
Burials at Kensico Cemetery
American women aviators
Screenwriters from California
Screenwriters from Michigan
Victims of aviation accidents or incidents in 1912
20th-century American women writers
20th-century American screenwriters